Jose Holguin-Veras is the William H. Hart Professor, Director of the Center for Infrastructure, Transportation, and the Environment, and Head of the Volvo Research and Educational Foundations (VREF) Center of Excellence on Sustainable Urban Freight Systems at the Rensselaer Polytechnic Institute. He is a graduate of the Universidad Autónoma de Santo Domingo, the Central University of Venezuela, and the University of Texas at Austin.

In 2013, Holguin-Veras received the White House Champion of Change Award for his contributions to freight transportation and disaster response. In 2014, he was elected a fellow of the American Society of Civil Engineers. Holguin-Veras was the leader of the team behind the "New York City Off-Hour Deliveries" project, which in 2017 became a finalist in the Institute for Operations Research and Management Sciences Franz Edelman Award Competition. Dr. Holguin-Veras has been named an Edelman Fellow in the Class of 2017. He is a specialist in urban freight systems.

References

Living people
Rensselaer Polytechnic Institute faculty
Universidad Autónoma de Santo Domingo alumni
Central University of Venezuela alumni
University of Texas at Austin alumni
Venezuelan civil engineers
Fellows of the American Society of Civil Engineers
Dominican Republic engineers
White Dominicans
Year of birth missing (living people)